This is a list of singles that charted in the top ten of the Billboard Argentina Hot 100 chart in 2023.

Top-ten singles
An asterisk (*) represents that a single is in the top ten as of the issue dated March 19, 2023.

Key
 – indicates single's top 10 entry was also its Hot 100 debut

2022 peaks

Notes 

Notes for re-entries

See also
 List of Billboard Argentina Hot 100 number-one singles of 2023

References

Argentina Hot 100 Top Ten Singles
Argentine record charts
Argentina 2023